The National Security Bureau, officially the National Security Bureau of the Regional Command of the Syrian Regional Branch, is a Ba'ath Party bureau which coordinates the work of Syria's intelligence agencies and advises the Regional Secretary. The individual intelligence agencies, however, in practice have a significant degree of independence and generally report directly to the president. The current head of the National Security Bureau is Ali Mamlouk.

Heads 
Abd al-Karim al-Jundi (September 1966 – 2 March 1969)
Naji Jamil (November 1970 – March 1978)
Ahmad Diyab (1979–1987)
Abdul Rauf al-Kasm (1987 – 17 June 2000)
Mohammed Saeed Bekheitan (21 June 2000 – 6 June 2005)
Hisham Ikhtiyar (9 June 2005 – 18 July 2012)
Ali Mamlouk (25 July 2012 – present)

Syrian intelligence agencies
General Intelligence Directorate (Internal Branch - 251)
Political Security Directorate
Military Intelligence Directorate
Air Force Intelligence Directorate

References

Organization of the Ba'ath Party
Syrian intelligence agencies